Shree Singha Devi Middle Secondary School() is a community service dedicated school operated under the government of Nepal and ministry of education. It is situated at ward no.8, Ishibu VDC of Terathum district, Nepal. It has a panoramic environment of teaching activities and the school has recently been added three level and has been made a complete lower secondary school with grades 8 totally. The current principal for this school is Mr. Ram Prasad Phombo and the former Principal was Mr. Durga Prasad Bhetwal. This school is serving to so many students from surrounding villages.

List of Teachers 
Mr. Ram prasad phombo (principal)
Mr. Dal bahadur Thapa
Mr. Kul Bahadur Limbu

Management Committee 
School Management committee is running the school and supervising it deeply with the help of Mr.Jay Bahadur Samamphe who is regarded as chairperson for this school. The former chairperson was Mr.Ganesh Niraula a local resident from ward no.8,Layeba. The election system has strong authority to choose the chairman and the elected chairman will be valid for only a year.

External links 

Schools in Nepal